The London Planetarium building is located on Marylebone Road, London. It is adjacent to and owned by Madame Tussauds. It previously housed a planetarium, offering shows related to space and astronomy. In 2006, it closed as a separate attraction and became part of Madame Tussauds. Since 2010, the building that previously included the London Planetarium has housed the Marvel Super Heroes 4D attraction.

History

The London Planetarium was opened by Prince Philip, Duke of Edinburgh on 19 March 1958, with public presentations commencing on 20 March. It occupied the site of a cinema destroyed in the Second World War and seated an audience of around 330 beneath a horizontal dome approximately 18 m/60 ft (18.29) in diameter. For its first five decades of operation, an optomechanical star projector, a Zeiss projector Mark IV, offered the audience a show based on a view of the night sky as seen from earth. Between 1977 and 1990, evening laser performances called 'Laserium' (see Ivan Dryer) were held.

In 1995, one of the world's first digital planetarium systems, Digistar II, was installed in a £4.5 million redevelopment, allowing monochromatic 3D journeys through space and many other kinds of shows to be presented. The Planetarium was used to teach students from University College London's astronomy department the complexity of the Celestial coordinate system, allowing for practical lectures delivered by a team of planetarium and UCL staff.

In 2004, the Planetarium was upgraded to a full-colour Digistar 3 system that allows both pre-rendered and real-time shows to transport the audience in an immersive full-dome video environment to distant realms of time and space.

In January 2006, freelance journalist Paul Sutherland broke the news in the London Evening Standard that the London Planetarium was being renamed the Auditorium and would replace astronomical presentations with entertainment shows. Madame Tussauds subsequently announced that in July 2006 the Auditorium would open with a show by Aardman Animations about celebrities. To say 'farewell' to the Planetarium, Madame Tussauds allowed free entry to the show in its penultimate week (24–30 April 2006).

Directors
Dr. Henry C. King served as Scientific Director before opening and managing the McLaughlin Planetarium in Toronto, Canada.

John Ebdon, author, broadcaster and Grecophile, was director of the London Planetarium (b. 1923 – d. 2005).

References

External links
"Why Tussauds no longer has space for the Planetarium" – article from London Evening Standard by Paul Sutherland
It inspired generations of children, but now the Planetarium is focusing on lesser stars  Article from The Times by Joanna Bale

Planetaria in the United Kingdom
Science and technology in the United Kingdom
Tourist attractions in London
Buildings and structures in the City of Westminster
1958 establishments in England
2006 disestablishments in England
Defunct planetaria